Criado is a surname. Notable people with the surname include:

Borja Criado (born 1982), Spanish footballer
Caroline Criado-Perez (born 1984), British feminist activist and journalist
Enrique Criado Navamuel (born 1981), Spanish diplomat and writer
Felipe Alfonso Criado (born 1993), Spanish footballer